Omanathinkal Kidavo is a lullaby in Malayalam that was composed by Irayimman Thampi on the birth of Maharajah Swathi Thirunal of Travancore. To date, it remains one of the most popular lullabies in the Malayalam language.

History 
The lullaby was composed (1813) by Thampi at the request of the then ruler of Travancore, Maharani Gowri Lakshmi Bayi, to put the baby King Swathi Thirunal to sleep. His birth was a long-awaited event for the royal family since it faced the threat of being annexed into British India under the Doctrine of Lapse for the want of a male heir. The lyrics of the poem reflect this sense of relief when it refers to the baby as a 'treasure from God' and 'the fruit of the tree of fortune'.

Music 
Originally composed in the Kurinji raga (melodic mode) and set to Adi tala (metre), it is most often performed in the Navaroj or Nilambari ragas. An interesting feature of this lullaby is that it doesn't mention the word sleep in it. The sleep is thus induced by the effect of the raga. The song lends itself well to the expressions of the navarasas and is therefore often set to dance.

Lyrics and translation

Lyrics in Malayalam

Transliteration

English translation 
The translation by A. H. Fox Strangways in The Music of Hindoostan is given here:

Is this sweet baby

The bright crescent's moon, or the charming flower of the lotus,

The honey in a flower, or the lustre of the full moon,

A pure coral gem, or the pleasant chatter of parrots,

A dancing peacock, or a sweet singing bird,

A bouncing young deer, or a bright shining swan,

A treasure from God, or the pet parrot in the hands of Īśvarī,

The tender leaf of the kalpa tree, or the fruit of my tree of fortune,

A golden casket to enclose the jewel of my love,

Nectar in my sight, or a light to dispel darkness,

The seed of my climbing fame, or a never-fading bright pearl,

The brilliance of the sun to dispel all the gloom of misery,

The Vedas in a casket, or the melodious vinā,

The lovely blossom put forth by the stout branch of my tree of enjoyment,

A cluster of pichāka buds, or sugar-candy sweet on the tongue,

The fragrance of musk, the best of all good,

A breeze laden with the scent of flowers, or the essence of purest gold,

A bowl of fresh milk, or of sweet smelling rose-water,

The field of all virtue, or an abode of all duty,

A cup of thirst-quenching cold water, or a sheltering shade,

A never-failing mallika flower, or my own stored up wealth,

The auspicious object of my gaze, or my most precious jewel,

A stream of virtuous beauty, or an image of the youthful Krishna,

The bright forehead mark of the goddess Lakshmī,

Or, by the mercy of Padmanābha, is it the source of my future happiness,

Is it, in this beautiful form, an Avatār of Krishna Himself?

Controversy 
The Irayimman Thampi Memorial Trust alleged that the first eight lines of the Oscar nominee Bombay Jayashri's song 'Pi's Lullaby' in the film Life of Pi were not an original composition but a translation into Tamil of the Omanathinkal Kidavo. The song had been nominated in the Original Song category for the Oscar Awards of 2013. Jayashri however maintained that she merely wrote what had come to her heart and denied the allegation against her.

References 

Indian songs
Malayalam-language songs
Lullabies
Songs about kings
Cultural depictions of male royals
Malayalam-language poems
Kingdom of Travancore